Leo Futsal, is an Armenian professional futsal club, playing in the Armenian Futsal Premier League. The club was founded in 2016 in Yerevan.  In 2016-2017 it won the Armenian Futsal Premier League and got a chance to participate in UEFA Champions League. In the first season of Armenian Futsal Premier League, Leo had 129 goals and 41 goals in the second season. The first season of UEFA was held in Cyprus and the second season in Croatia. In 2017-2018 Leo Club won the Armenian Futsal Premier League one more time and went on to take part in the Champions League in Sweden. Currently, it continues its activities in the 2018-2019 Armenian Futsal Premier League.

Statistics

Goals

Players

Current squad

List of Legioners

Technical staff

References

Leo
2016 establishments in Armenia
Futsal clubs established in 2016